Mifleget Poale Zion VeHaHugim HaMarksistim beEretz Yisrael (lit. The Party of the Workers of Zion and the Marxist Circles of the Land of Israel) was the youth group of a faction of Poale Zion, the labour Zionist movement, in Mandate Palestine in the 1930s, which later merged into the Revolutionary Communist League. Tony Cliff, later the leader of the International Socialists, was a youthful member. It was linked to the Independent Labour Party in Britain, and affiliated to the London Bureau of socialist parties.

See also
 Jewish Communist Labour Party (Poalei Zion)
 Jewish Communist Party (Poalei Zion)
 Jewish Communist Union (Poalei Zion)
 Poale Zion

References

External links
"Against the Stream", The Internationalist, Summer 2001
Tony Cliff's autobiography

Poale Zion
Zionist youth movements
Youth organizations based in the State of Palestine
Youth wings of social democratic parties
Youth wings of political parties in Israel
Youth organizations established in the 1930s
Independent Labour Party